Miguel Heitor (born 20 November 1970) is a former footballer who played as a midfielder. Born in Portugal, he was a Macau international.

Career

In 2007, Heitor was appointed Director of Football Development of the Qatar Stars League.

References

External links

 

1970 births
Association football midfielders
Living people
Macau footballers
Macau international footballers
Macau people of Portuguese descent